Strand Road is a major road in downtown Yangon, Burma. It crosses the city in a west–east direction and runs parallel to the Yangon River. It contains many important government buildings, including the Ministry of Trade building,  court and the British embassy. It also contains the 5-star hotel, Strand Hotel, built in 1901.

History 
Howard Malcom, an American traveller to Burma in 1836 noted that there was a main street in Moulmein called Strand Road which extends along the Salween river about three miles. Its namesake was followed by streets in Rangoon and other Burmese cities in later years when the British occupied Burma after Second Anglo-Burmese War and Third Anglo-Burmese War. The Strand Road in Yangon was one of them.

In 2011, Asia World partnered with the Yangon City Development Committee to upgrade Strand Road.

Gallery

References

Streets in Yangon